Chelutay (3 km) (Shuluuta (3 km)) is a rural locality (a settlement) in Zaigrayevsky District, Republic of Buryatia, Russia. The population was 682 as of 2010. There are 9 streets.

Geography 
Chelutay (3 km) is located 16 km southeast of Zaigrayevo (the district's administrative centre) by road. Chelutay is the nearest rural locality.

References 

Rural localities in Zaigrayevsky District